Geordie – Masters of Rock is a compilation album by rock band Geordie. It was released in 1974 by EMI.

Track listing
"House of the Rising Sun" (traditional, arranged by Geordie)
"All Because of You" (Malcolm)
"Can you do it" (Malcolm)
"Give you till Monday" (Malcolm)
"Red Eyed Lady" (Malcolm)
"Don't do that" (Malcolm)
"Ride on Baby" (Geordie) 
"Keep On Rocking" (Malcolm)
"Black Cat Woman" (Malcolm)
"Electric Lady" (Malcolm)
"Natural Born Loser" (Malcolm)
"Ain't it just like a Woman" (Malcolm)

Personnel 
 Brian Johnson (vocals)
 Vic Malcolm (guitar)
 Tom Hill (bass)
 Brian Gibson (drums)

References

Geordie (band) albums
1974 compilation albums
EMI Records albums